Myriotrochidae is a family of sea cucumbers.

Description and characteristics 
Members of this family have digitate tentacles, bearing 2-8 digits on each side. They lack podia, radial canals and respiratory tree.

The soft body wall is supported by ossicles which are generally wheel-shaped with 8 or more spokes.

List of genera 
The following genera are recognised in the family Myriotrochidae:
 Acanthotrochus Danielssen & Koren, 1881 -- 3 species
 Achiridota Clark, 1908 -- 3 species
 †Hemisphaeranthos Terquem & Berthelin, 1875 -- 4 species
 Myriotrochus Steenstrup, 1851 -- 19 species
 Neolepidotrochus Bohn, 2005 -- 5 species
 Parvotrochus Gage & Billett, 1986 -- 1 species
 Prototrochus Belyaev & Mironov, 1982 -- 17 species
 Siniotrochus Pawson, 1971 -- 3 species
 Trochoderma Théel, 1877 -- 1 species

References

 
Echinoderm families
Extant Early Cretaceous first appearances